Prach Boondiskulchok is a Thai-British composer and fortepianist.

Education 
Boondiskulchok was born in Bangkok, and moved to the United Kingdom to study at Yehudi Menhuin School, and later Guildhall School of Music and Drama.

Career 
Whilst studying at Guildhall, Boondiskulchok founded the piano trio Linos Piano Trio with violinist Konrad Elias-Trostman and cellist Vladimir Waltham in 2007. The trio won the RPS Albert and Eugenie Frost Prize in 2014, and the Melbourne International Chamber Music Competition in 2015. They released an album of all Carl Philipp Emanuel Bach's piano trios in 2020.

In 2018, Boondiskulchok, along with Jonathan Dove, Sally Beamish and Giles Swayne, was commissioned to compose a piece for Endellion Quartet's 40th anniversary concert. The works were premiered in 2019.

Published works

References

External links

 Prach Boondiskulchock's home page
 Linos Piano Trio home page

Prach Boondiskulchok
Fortepianists
21st-century pianists
Year of birth missing (living people)
Living people
Alumni of the Guildhall School of Music and Drama
Prach Boondiskulchok